Alan Reid (born 2 May 1950, Glasgow, Scotland) is a Scottish folk multi-instrumentalist and songwriter. He was a founding member of Battlefield Band, which combined traditional Celtic melodies and new material.

Biography

1969–2010: the Battlefield Band years 
Alan Reid joined Battlefield Band in 1969, at a time when they were evolving into a folk group. From 1973, Battlefield Band quickly became pre-eminent in the emerging Scottish Traditional music scene, becoming established firmly at the forefront where they remain today. Battlefield Band made two albums with the Breton label Arfolk (released in 1976 & 1978) and three albums with the Topic label (released in 1977, 1978 & 1979) but since 1980 have recorded exclusively with Temple Records. Reid travelled the world with the band and has been involved in over 30 albums. Although the band's lineup changed many times, Reid was keyboarder and known as the "father and son" of Battlefield Band.

One of the many accomplishments credited to Alan Reid, is his use of keyboards in a Scottish folk band.  Starting first with a pump organ, then moving later to electronic keyboards, the sound originally garnered approval and momentary objection from fans and music writers alike.  But soon, the sound of the keyboards became part of the basic sound of Battlefield Band, and left the door open for other Celtic bands to tailor their sound to their taste.

In 1997, while remaining a member of Battlefield Band, Reid released his first solo album, The Sunlit Eye, on Temple Records. It featured brand new songs and tunes. In 2001, a song and tune book Martyrs Rogues and Worthies was released by Kinmor Music, the publishing arm of Temple Records. Reid also formed a duo with singer/guitarist Rob van Sante and released a CD in 2002 entitled Under The Blue which featured more new songs. He also appeared as guest singer in Vol. 1 and 2 of the Linn Records series of the complete works of Robert Burns. In 2009, he was nominated at the Scots Traditional Awards in the Composer of the Year category.

Reid is a prolific and fluid songwriter, his compositions full of imagery and stories of common folk and historical figures as well.  As interesting and moving as the stories are, his musical compositions leave the listener with a strong, memorable and very singable melody.

2010–present: Battlefield Band departure and duo with van Sante 
After four decades (from 1969 to 2010) as an ever-present member of Battlefield Band, Reid decided that it was time to bow out in order to develop his writing and to follow other musical paths and partnerships. He left the band at the end of 2010 to concentrate on his musical duo with Rob van Sante who had also been Battlefield Band's sound engineer for a number of years.

In early 2011, the duo undertook a tour of Australia and New Zealand, guesting at Australia's National Folk Festival. Reid released an album with Rob on the life of the Scots born sailor John Paul Jones, an album for which he has written all the material.

In 2013, the duo embarked on several tours of Scotland, Germany and the United States and made some festival appearances in the UK and Europe.

In 2011, Reid released Recollection, a compilation album of the finest songs he wrote during his forty years with Battlefield Band.

In 2012, the duo released a third album The Adventures of John Paul Jones and in 2014 a fourth album Rough Diamonds .

In January 2015, the duo embarked on a US tour which ended on 1 February 2015. A North-America tour followed from 13 till 29 March 2015, visiting mainly Canada.

On 15 January 2016, the duo embarked on a 16-date US tour due to end on 7 February 2016.

Discography

Battlefield Band 

All the Battlefield Band albums from 1976's Scottish Folk (Arfolk SB349) (re-released as Farewell to Nova Scotia on Escalibur Records) up to 2009's Zama Zama...Try Your Luck... (Temple Records COMD2102)

Solo 
1997 The Sunlit Eye (Temple Records) (studio album)
2011 Recollection (Temple Records) (compilation)

Alan Reid and Brian McNeill Duo albums 
1981 Sidetracks

Alan Reid and Rob van Sante Duo albums 
2001 Under the Blue (Red Sands Records RSCD 001)
2009 The Rise and Fall o' Charlie (Red Sands Records RSCD 002)
2012 The Adventures of John Paul Jones (Red Sands Records RSCD 003)
2014 Rough Diamonds  (Red Sands Records RSCD 004)

Guest appearances 
Tuomas Holopainen – Music Inspired by the Life and Times of Scrooge (2014)

References

External links
 Alan Reid Official website
 Temple Records

1950 births
Living people
20th-century Scottish male singers
Scottish songwriters
Scottish folk musicians
Battlefield Band members
Topic Records artists
21st-century Scottish male singers
British male songwriters